Diary of a Wimpy Kid is a 2010 American comedy film directed by Thor Freudenthal and based on Jeff Kinney's 2007 book of the same name. The film stars Zachary Gordon and Robert Capron. Devon Bostick, Rachael Harris, Steve Zahn, and Chloë Grace Moretz also have prominent roles. It is the first installment in the Diary of a Wimpy Kid film series. and was followed by three sequels, Diary of a Wimpy Kid: Rodrick Rules (2011), Diary of a Wimpy Kid: Dog Days (2012), and Diary of a Wimpy Kid: The Long Haul (2017). 

20th Century Fox released the film theatrically in the US on March 19, 2010. The film earned $75.7 million on a $15 million budget and was followed by three sequels: Diary of a Wimpy Kid: Rodrick Rules (2011), Diary of a Wimpy Kid: Dog Days (2012), and Diary of a Wimpy Kid: The Long Haul (2017). An animated reboot was released to Disney+ in 2021 titled Diary of a Wimpy Kid.

Plot
11-year-old Greg Heffley is apprehensive about beginning middle school. On his first day, he quickly discovers the ups and downs, such as the missing stall doors in the boys' bathroom and the difficulties of obtaining a seat during lunch. During P.E. class, Greg and his best friend, Rowley Jefferson, escape from a game of Gladiator and learn from their friend, Chirag Gupta, about a moldy piece of cheese on the basketball court that makes anyone who touches it an outcast and that the only way to get rid of what is known as "the Cheese Touch" is to pass it on to someone else. They also meet Angie Steadman, a 7th-grader who isolates herself from the other students to "survive". Greg states his intention of becoming the most popular student in school, as well as earning a place in the school yearbook as a class favorite.

On Halloween, while Greg and Rowley are out trick-or-treating, a group of teenage boys drive by in a pickup truck and spray a fire extinguisher at them. When Greg threatens to call the police, the boys chase him and Rowley to Greg's grandmother's house, but the latter two escape them after Greg accidentally damages the truck.

The boys join Safety Patrol and try out for a contest that offers a student a chance to become the new cartoonist for the school paper. Greg accidentally breaks Rowley's arm, making Rowley popular, and Rowley also wins the cartoonist contest. During a Safety Patrol assignment, Greg walks kindergartners down a neighborhood street without Rowley, but panics when he encounters a truck identical to the teenagers' from Halloween and hides the kids in a construction zone. After being spotted by a neighbor who mistakes him for Rowley, he abandons the kindergarteners and flees. To his bewilderment, Rowley is suspended from Safety Patrol, but Greg eventually confesses the truth. Distraught at Greg's mistreatment of him, Rowley ends their friendship. Greg is dismissed from Safety Patrol while Rowley is reinstated as captain. Greg is replaced by their classmate Collin as Rowley's best friend. Greg attempts to pursue popularity without Rowley, but all his efforts fail.

One day at recess, Greg and Rowley loudly confront each other and a circle of students encourages them to fight; however, neither of them is good at fighting. The teenage boys from Halloween arrive at the scene and force Rowley to eat part of the cheese after the other kids, except for Greg, are chased inside the school. They flee the scene when the school's gym teacher, Coach Malone, arrives, but when the other kids come back out and notice that the cheese has been eaten, Greg takes the blame to save Rowley's reputation, mending their friendship; in the yearbook, Greg and Rowley win "Cutest Friends."

Cast

 Zachary Gordon as Greg Heffley, a sixth grader who yearns to be popular.
 Nathaniel Marten as adult Greg with Gordon providing the voice.
 Dylan Bell as young Greg.
 L.J. Benet provides the uncredited singing voice of Greg.
 Robert Capron as Rowley Jefferson, Greg's childish best friend.
 Rachael Harris as Susan Heffley, Greg's mother.
 Devon Bostick as Rodrick Heffley, Greg's older brother.
 Chloë Grace Moretz as Angie Steadman, a seventh-grader at Greg's school who is a reporter for the school paper. She is a brand new character not found in the original books.
 Steve Zahn as Frank Heffley, Greg's father.
 Grayson Russell as Fregley, a weird classmate of Greg's.
 Laine MacNeil as Patty Farrell, Greg's arch-enemy.
 Madison Bell as young Patty.
 Karan Brar as Chirag Gupta, a friend of Greg's. 
 Connor and Owen Fielding as Manny Heffley, Greg's little brother.
 Raugi Yu as Vice Principal Roy, the Vice Principal who appears on the intercom or TV giving news.
 Jennifer Clement as Mrs. Flint, Greg's homeroom teacher.
 Ryan Grantham as Rodney James, Greg’s classmate and friend.
 Alex Ferris as Collin Lee, Rowley's substitute best friend during his fight with Greg.
 Andrew McNee as Coach Eduardo Malone, Greg's gym teacher. In the books, he is known as Coach Underwood or Mr. Underwood.
 Belita Moreno as Mrs. Norton, Greg's acting teacher.
 Alfred E. Humphreys as Robert Jefferson, Rowley's father who dislikes Greg.
 Kaye Capron as Linda Jefferson, Rowley's mother.
 Nicholas Carey as Pete Hosey, the leader of the teenagers who threw water at Greg and Rowley.
 Donnie McNeil as Wade, one of the teenagers who threw water at Greg and Rowley.
 Samuel Patrick Chu as Carter, another one of the 3 teenagers who threw water at Greg and Rowley.
 Rob LaBelle as Mr. Bertrand Winsky, the leader of the Safety Patrol.
 Harrison Houde as Darren Walsh, Greg's classmate who is infamous for starting the Cheese Touch.
 Severin Korfer as Dieter Muller, a German exchange student who took the Cheese Touch with him back to his homeland of Düsseldorf, Germany. He is based on Abe Hall, the last victim of the Cheese Touch, in the books. For the film's German dub, the character is a French national.
 Owen Best as Bryce Anderson, one of Greg's classmates who is the popular kid at school. He is said to have a "cute butt".
 Samantha Page and Ava Hughes as Shelly and Marley, two girls who adore Rowley.
 Cainan Wiebe as Quentin, a bully who teased about Rowley asking Greg if he wants to come over after school and play.
 Peter New as adult Quentin with Wiebe providing the voice.
 Jacob Smith as Benny Wells, A student in wrestling class. 
 Karin Konoval as Mrs. Irvine, the neighbor who witnessed Greg's actions during his Safety Patrol assignment.
 Adam Osei as Marty Porter, the school treasurer and a student who played a tree in the school play.
 Jake D. Smith as Archie Kelly, Another student who played a tree in the school play.
 Sean Bygrave as Coach Brewer, a coach who demonstrates with Coach Malone on wrestling.
 Paul Hubbard as Brock Branigan P.I., A possible parody of Tom Selleck's Magnum P.I..

Release

Tie-in book

A tie-in book, written by Kinney, called The Wimpy Kid Movie Diary, was published on March 16, 2010, by Amulet Books (an imprint of Abrams Books). It includes film stills, storyboards, preliminary concept drawings and also behind-the-scenes information to humorously chronicle the making of Diary of a Wimpy Kid, Diary of a Wimpy Kid: Rodrick Rules, and Diary of a Wimpy Kid: Dog Days. It also includes some new illustrations.

Home media
The film was released on DVD and Blu-ray on August 3, 2010. The Blu-ray version features six pages from Rowley's diary, Diary of an Awesome, Friendly Kid. The film was released on the streaming service Disney+ on November 12, 2019; its launch date.

Reception

Critical response
Review aggregator site Rotten Tomatoes gives the film an approval rating of 54% based on 106 reviews and an average rating of 5.51/10. The website's critical consensus reads, "Unlike its bestselling source material, Diary of a Wimpy Kid fails to place a likable protagonist at the center of its middle-school humor – and its underlying message is drowned out as a result." It also holds a rating of 56/100 at Metacritic, based on 26 reviews, indicating "mixed or average reviews". Audience surveyed by CinemaScore gave this film an "A-."

Roger Ebert gave the film three-and-a-half stars out of four, writing "It's nimble, bright and funny. It doesn't dumb down. It doesn't patronize. It knows something about human nature." Glenn Whipp of the Associated Press was less positive, saying, "In transferring the clean, precise humor of Kinney's illustrations and prose to the big-screen, the material loses just a bit of its charm." At the Movies host David Stratton gave the film one star while co-host Margaret Pomeranz gave it half a star. Stratton called the film "tiresome" and said there was "nothing remotely interesting in Thor Freudenthal's direction or the screenplay." Pomeranz disliked the character of Greg Heffley, saying "I really thought he was unpleasant. I did not want to spend time with him. I could not wait for the end of this film."

OregonLive.com gave the movie a C+ grade, criticizing it for being "too often dull, unappealing and clumsy, hobbled by unnecessary changes and inventions that add no charm, energy or, truly, point."

Box office
Despite a lack of distinctive marketing, Diary of a Wimpy Kid drew a decent crowd, opening to $22.1 million on approximately 3,400 screens at 3,077 sites, in second place at the weekend box office behind Alice in Wonderland but beating out the heavily hyped The Bounty Hunter. It was the biggest start ever for a non-animated, non-fantasy children's book adaptation. Diary of a Wimpy Kid grossed more in its first three days than other film adaptions to children's novels like How to Eat Fried Worms and Hoot grossed in their entire runs. The film grossed $64,003,625 in North America and $11,696,873 in other territories for a worldwide total of $75,700,498.

Accolades

Expanded franchise

Sequels 

Three sequels were released in 2011, 2012 and 2017 respectively. Diary of a Wimpy Kid: Rodrick Rules was released on March 25, 2011. It was based on the second book in the series, Rodrick Rules. Zachary Gordon reprised his role in the film. Diary of a Wimpy Kid: Dog Days was released on August 3, 2012, and is based on The Last Straw and Dog Days, including scenes from both books. An animated short film, Diary of a Wimpy Kid: Class Clown, was released along with the DVD of Dog Days. A film based on The Long Haul was released in May 2017 and features a new cast starring Jason Drucker, Alicia Silverstone, and Tom Everett Scott, but received generally negative reviews.

Animated reboot 

An animated reboot directed by Swinton Scott was released on Disney+ on December 3, 2021. Unlike the other films, this was the first Diary of a Wimpy Kid film to be animated fully in computer-generated imagery and features Greg and the characters in colors. Originally set as an adaptation of Cabin Fever by Kinney, it was re-announced in 2018 as an animated series but switched to a CGI movie in 2019. It stars Brady Noon, Ethan William Childress, and Chris Diamantopoulos.

References

External links
 
 
 Diary of a Wimpy Kid at the TCM Movie Database
 

2010 films
2010s children's comedy films
2010s English-language films
American children's comedy films
Diary of a Wimpy Kid (film series)
Films about bullying
Films shot in Vancouver
American films with live action and animation
Middle school films
20th Century Fox films
Dune Entertainment films
Films directed by Thor Freudenthal
Films scored by Theodore Shapiro
2010 comedy films
2010s American films
Films about dysfunctional families